The Queen Victoria Hospital is a health facility on Thornton Road in Thornton Road, Morecambe, Lancashire, England. It is managed by the University Hospitals of Morecambe Bay NHS Foundation Trust.

History
The foundation stone for the facility was laid in August 1900. It was opened by Lord Lathom as the Morecambe Queen Victoria Cottage Hospital in September 1902. Additions included a small extension in 1912, a new female wing in 1923 and a mortuary in 1932 as well as a nurses' home in 1934. It joined the National Health Service in 1948. The main hospital was demolished in 2002 and replaced by a modern health centre which retained the Queen Victoria Hospital name.

References

1902 establishments in England
Hospitals established in 1902
Hospital buildings completed in 1902
Hospitals in Lancashire
NHS hospitals in England